The Forgotten Winchester is a Winchester Model 1873 lever-action centerfire rifle that archaeologists discovered in 2014 leaning against a Juniper tree in Great Basin National Park in Nevada. The gun was manufactured in 1882, but nothing is known of its abandonment. The bottom of its stock was buried in 4-5 inches of accumulated soil and vegetation, and a round of ammunition stored in its buttstock dated between 1887 and 1911, indicating that it had been resting there for many years. A post about the weathered gun on the park's Facebook page captured the public's imagination and went viral because of the mystery of who left the gun propped against the tree and why they never returned for it. This gun has become an iconic rifle of the American west.

Discovery 
Prior to the rifle's discovery, the National Park Service had started a $280,000 fuels reduction project around Strawberry Creek Campground to prevent campfires from sparking wildfires in the surrounding forest. As part of the project, the Park Service sent staff from their cultural resources office to search the project area for artifacts, which is when archaeologist Eva Jensen found the rifle leaning against a tree above the campground. The discovery was fortunate because less than two years later the Strawberry Fire swept through the area and consumed the juniper tree the rifle had been leaning against.

Conservation and description 
The rifle is a Winchester Repeating Arms Company  Model 1873, the same type featured in the 1950 film Winchester '73. The rifle's serial number indicates that it was manufactured in 1882. Winchester mass-produced this model of .44-40 caliber rifle that became known as the "Gun that Won the West," making 25,000 of them in 1882 alone. The First Model 1873 has a serial number of 1 to about 31000. The Second Model has serial number of 31000 to 90000.  Original Winchester factory records are viewable for the 1873 model from the Cody Firearms Museum in Cody, Wyoming, from serial number 1 thru 720496, except 497 thru 610 and 199551 thru 199598.  

The park service sent the gun to the Firearms Museum at the Buffalo Bill Center of the West in Cody, Wyoming for analysis and conservation. A team of researchers took the firearm to a local hospital to be X-rayed under the patient name "Rifle". While the chamber and ammunition tube were not loaded, the X-rays revealed a live .44-Winchester centerfire caliber cartridge in a compartment inside the buttstock. This cartridge was manufactured by the Union Metallic Cartridge Company sometime between 1887 and 1911. The X-ray also showed that a crack in the stock had been repaired with metal pins. The conservators used hydroxypropyl cellulose to preserve the wooden gunstock and prevent it from further deterioration. 

The Forgotten Winchester is on permanent display in the Baker Visitor Center of Great Basin National Park, along with its cartridge.

References 

Great Basin National Park
Winchester Repeating Arms Company firearms
Individual firearms